Alfonso Clemente de Arostegui y Cañavate (Villanueva de la Jara, 5 March 1698 - Madrid, 2 October 1774) was a Spanish bishop, writer, lawyer and diplomat.

He studied at the University of Salamanca and at the University of Alcalá de Henares. He worked for the Departments of Instituta and Decrees at the University Complutense; in Zaragoza's mayor's office; in Roman Rota; as an interim minister plenipotentiary of Spain in Rome; as an ambassador in Rome; at the Council of Castile; in the Real Academia de Bellas Artes de San Fernando; as a royal commissioner of the Holy Crusade; in the Council of State; and as a member of the House of Castile.

He bequeathed all his books to the College of Seminario de San Julián in Cuenca, also leaving two trusts to support librarians and their corresponding libraries, and two student scholarships.

Works
Concordia patoralis super iure diocesano inter episcopos et praelatos inferiores, Alcalá de Henares, 1734.
De historia ecclesiae hispaniensis excolenda exhortatio ad hispanos Roma, 1747.
Historia de la ciudad de Osma y de la ereccion de su obispado, escrita en latin por D. Alfonso Clemente de Arostegui, manuscript.

Bibliography

Miguel Jiménez Monteserín, Hacia Cervantes: de los libros al hombre. Univ de Castilla La Mancha, 2005.
Didier Ozanam, Les diplomates espagnols du XVIIIe siècle: introduction et répertoire biographique [1700-1808], Madrid: Casa de Velázquez, 1998.
José de Rezabal y Ugarte, Biblioteca de los escritores que han sido individuos de los seis colegios mayores: de San Ildefonso de la Universidad de Alcalá, de Santa Cruz de la de Valladolid, de San Bartolomé, de Cuenca, San Salvador de Oviedo, y del Arzobispado de la de Salamanca, con varios indices... Madrid: Impr. de Sancha, 1805, p. 74 y ss.

Spanish male writers
18th-century Spanish lawyers
18th-century Latin-language writers
1698 births
1774 deaths
University of Salamanca alumni